Hamid Aboutalebi (born 16 June 1957) is a former Iranian diplomat and ambassador. Aboutalebi was previously ambassador of Iran to Australia, the European Union, Belgium, Italy, and a political director general to Iran's Ministry of Foreign Affairs. He was part of Iran's UN delegation in New York City in the 1990s.

Professional background
Aboutalebi obtained his Ph.D. in historical sociology from  Katholieke Universiteit Leuven in 1999, after having completed master's degrees in sociology (from Sorbonne Nouvelle University, Paris) and in the history of Islamic civilization and culture (from Tehran University). Aboutalebi also earned his bachelor's degree in sociology from Tehran University.

His professional publications include Basic Challenges of U.S Foreign Policy towards Iran (2009), Rocky Mountains of Nuclear Extremism (2009), Turkey: Modern Diplomacy and New Ottoman Caliphate (2009), and New Challenges of Iran Foreign Policy towards U.S. (2010). He published Anthropology of Ethics; First Volume of Philosophy of Social Ethics in 2013.

Controversy
It has been claimed that Aboutalebi was one of the student radicals involved in the Iran hostage crisis, in which 52 Americans, including diplomats from the US embassy in Tehran, were held captive from 1979 to 1980.

Aboutalebi denied participation in the takeover of the US embassy, emphasising that he was brought in to translate and negotiate following the occupation. Aboutalebi was a student and member of the Muslim Student Followers of the Imam's Line, comprising students from several major science and technology universities of Tehran, which occupied the U.S. embassy in Tehran. Ebrahim Asgharzadeh, a leading member of the core group who organized and led the embassy takeover, told BBC Persian that Aboutalebi's involvement was peripheral. "Calling him a hostage-taker is simply wrong", Asgharzadeh said.

Due to the claims, Aboutalebi's appointment as ambassador to the UN was opposed by numerous U.S. lawmakers and diplomats, some of whom asked the US Department of State to deny his application for a visa.

On 1 April 2014, in the United States Senate, Republican Senator Ted Cruz introduced Senate bill 2195, a bill that would allow the President of the United States to deny a visa to any ambassador to the United Nations who has been alleged to have been engaged in espionage activities or a terrorist activity against the United States or its allies, and may pose a threat to U.S. national security interests. The bill was a reaction to Aboutalebi's selection as Iran's ambassador. The bill passed the Senate on 7 April, and the United States House of Representatives on 10 April. President Barack Obama signed the bill on 18 April 2014.

Complicating the situation were the ongoing nuclear negotiations between the United States and Iran. Some have argued that denying Abutalebi's entry to the United States would violate the 1947 treaty agreement which was a prerequisite for the United Nations' agreement to locate their headquarters in New York City. United States government never denied a visa for Aboutalebi. According to New York Times: "By not explicitly rejecting the visa application, the White House appeared to be leaving Iran a way to resolve the standoff".

Views
He is claimed to be close to The Reformists and to the High Ranked Executives of Construction Party in terms of political bent.

It is speculated  that his resignation from his office in June 2020 is related to his views about the principles of negotiation in foreign policy as suggested by a series of tweets  in his official Twitter account.

References

External links

1957 births
Living people
Permanent Representatives of Iran to the United Nations
University of Tehran alumni
Muslim Student Followers of the Imam's Line
Faculty of Theology and Islamic Studies of the University of Tehran alumni
Faculty of Social Sciences of the University of Tehran alumni